Anthidium palmarum is a species of bee in the family Megachilidae, the leaf-cutter, carder, or mason bees.

Distribution
Middle America and North America

Synonyms
Synonyms for this species include:
Anthidium palmarum micheneri Schwarz, 1957

References

External links
Images

palmarum
Insects described in 1904